Zoveydi-ye Musa (also Romanized as Zoveydī-ye Mūsá; also known as Zobeydī-ye Mūsá, Zobīdī, Zobīdī-ye Mūsá, and Zoveydī) is a village in Howmeh-ye Sharqi Rural District, in the Central District of Ramhormoz County, Khuzestan Province, Iran. At the 2006 census, its population was 109, in 28 families.

References 

Populated places in Ramhormoz County